The canton of Saint-Firmin is a former administrative division in southeastern France. It was disbanded following the French canton reorganisation which came into effect in March 2015. It consisted of 8 communes, which joined the canton of Saint-Bonnet-en-Champsaur in 2015. It had 1,625 inhabitants (2012).

The canton comprised the following communes:

Aspres-lès-Corps
Chauffayer
Le Glaizil
La Chapelle-en-Valgaudémar
Saint-Firmin
Saint-Jacques-en-Valgodemard
Saint-Maurice-en-Valgodemard
Villar-Loubière

Demographics

See also
Cantons of the Hautes-Alpes department

References

Former cantons of Hautes-Alpes
2015 disestablishments in France
States and territories disestablished in 2015